Beta Sculptoris, Latinized from β Sculptoris, is a single, blue-white hued star in the southern constellation of Sculptor. It has an apparent visual magnitude of 4.37, which is bright enough to be seen with the naked eye. Based upon an annual parallax shift of 18.74 mas as seen from Earth, it is located 174 light years from the Sun.

This is a B-type giant star with a stellar classification of B9.5IIIp(HgMnSi).  It belongs to the class of chemically peculiar stars known as a Mercury-Manganese star, showing overabundances of mercury, manganese, and silicon in its spectrum. It is a suspected α2 CVn variable with magnitude variation from 4.35 to 4.39. The star has nearly three times the mass of the Sun and double the Sun's radius. It is radiating 81 times the Sun's luminosity from its photosphere at an effective temperature of 12,110 K.

References

B-type giants
Alpha2 Canum Venaticorum variables
Mercury-manganese stars
Suspected variables
Sculptor (constellation)
Sculptoris, Beta
CD-38 15527
221507
116231
8937